This list of Quebec's 1000-meter peaks is a list of the highest summits in Quebec, used in the mountaineering sport of peak bagging. Ranked peaks have  of clean prominence.

See also
 Northeast 111 4000-footers 
 New England Four-thousand footers 
 Adirondack Forty-sixers
 New England Fifty Finest

References

Lists of mountains by prominence
Lists of mountains by isolation
Quebec
Quebec

Peaks